Francesca Testasecca (born 1 April 1991 in Foligno) is an Italian model, the winner of the 71st edition of Miss Italia. She won the crown on 13 September 2010.

Biography 
Graduated from istituto tecnico turistico, Francesca Testasecca is the second daughter of an autobus driver and a clerk.

Francesca is the second ever Miss Umbria to win the contest: the first one was Raffaella De Carolis in 1962.

On 25 December 2010 she co-hosted the new show 24mila voci alongside Milly Carlucci.In 2012, Francesca began filming her first film, Il Ragioniere della Mafia. The movie is set to come out in 2013.

References

1991 births
Living people
Italian beauty pageant winners
People from Foligno